Elena Brambilla (29 July 1942 – 3 February 2018) was an Italian historian.

Biography
Elena Brambilla was born in Milan, 29 July 1942. She was the daughter of Franca Brambilla Ageno. Brambilla specialized in modern history, graduating in 1967 University of Milan.

She worked first as an assistant before becoming a professor at the Faculty of Letters and Philosophy of the University of Milan, starting in 1983. She coordinated the Italian-French university degree in two-year specialization in modern history. Between 1998 and 1999, she collaborated with the Italian-Germanic Historical Institute (ISIG) in Trento. She devoted herself in particular to the history of the university, of medicine, and of science, to the relations between State and Church, as well as the history of women and gender identity.

Brambilla wrote several essays and collaborated in editing some periodicals, such as Rivista di storia della filosofia, Rivista di storia della Chiesa in Italia, Rivista di studi politici internazionali, Società e storia, Diritto comunitario e degli scambi internazionali, Quaderni storici, Nuova Rivista Storica, Rivista Storica Italiana and Communications of the Political Research Center of the Sorbonne. She was a member of the board of Unicomli, providing a series of history editions for Lombardy.

Brambilla died in Milan, 3 February 2018.

Selected works
Bambini e genitori insieme: esperienze e proposte di catechesi familiare, Brescia, Morcelliana, 1981, p. 120.
La città e la corte: buone e cattive maniere tra Medioevo ed età moderna, Guerini e associati, 1991, .
with Giovanni Muto, La Lombardia spagnola, Milano, Unicopli, 1997, p. 426, .
Alle origini del Sant'Uffizio: penitenza, confessione e giustizia spirituale dal Medioevo al XXVI secolo, Bologna, il Mulino, 2000 (1ª edizione), p. 590, .
Genealogie del sapere: università, professioni giuridiche e nobiltà togata in Italia (XIII - XVII secolo), Milano, Unicopli, 2005, p. 384, .
La giustizia intollerante: inquisizioni e tribunali confessionali in Europa (secoli IV-XVIII), Roma, Carocci Editore, 2006 (1ª edizione), p. 272, .
with Carlo Capra, Aurora Scotti, Istituzioni e cultura in età napoleonica, Milano, FrancoAngeli, 2008, p. 657, .
Routines of existence: time, life and after life in society and religion, Pisa, Pisa University Press, 2009, p. 120, .
with Alessia Lirosi, Le cronache di Santa Cecilia: un monastero femminile a Roma in età moderna, Roma, Viella, 2009, p. 309, .
with Daniel Armogathe, Du lien politique au lien social: les élites, Aix-en-Provence, UMR Telemme, 2009, p. 250.
Corpi invasi e viaggi dell'anima: santità, possessione, esorcismo dalla teologia barocca alla medicina illuminista, Roma, Viella, 2010 (1ª edizione), p. 302, .
with Letizia Arcangeli, Stefano Levati, Sociabilità e relazioni femminili nell'Europa moderna, Milano, FrancoAngeli, 2013, p. 323, .
with Anne Jacobson Schutte, La storia di genere in Italia in età moderna: un confronto tra storiche nordamericane e italiane, Roma, Viella, 2014, p. 468, .

References

External links
 A history between commitment and research. Interview with Elena Brambilla (PDF), edited by Marina Caffiero, Società Italiana per la Storia dell'Età Moderna (SISEM) (in Italian)

1942 births
2018 deaths
20th-century Italian historians
21st-century Italian historians
20th-century Italian non-fiction writers
21st-century Italian non-fiction writers
20th-century Italian women writers
21st-century Italian women writers
University of Milan alumni
Academic staff of the University of Milan
Gender studies academics
Italian women historians
Academic journal editors